Balya Bhavan  is a prominent Assamese medium school in Jorhat in the state of Assam, India. This co-educational institute was established on 10 November 1950.

References

External links 

Schools in Assam
Education in Jorhat district
Jorhat district
Educational institutions established in 1950
1950 establishments in Assam